Birch is the common name for trees of the genus Betula.

Birch or Birchs may also refer to:

 BIRCH, a clustering algorithm
 "Birches" (poem), a poem by Robert Frost
 Birch (surname)
 The Birch, an American undergraduate journal of Eastern European and Eurasian culture
 "Birch", a song by Big Red Machine featuring Taylor Swift from the album How Long Do You Think It's Gonna Last?

Places 
Australia
 Birchs Inlet, Tasmania

United Kingdom
 Birch, Essex, England
 Birch, Greater Manchester, England

United States
 Birch, Nevada, a ghost town
 Birch, Wisconsin, a town
 Birch, Ashland County, Wisconsin, an unincorporated community
 Birch Hill, Wisconsin, a census-designated place
 Birch Township, Minnesota
 Birch Tree, Missouri
 Birch County, South Carolina, a proposed county

Companies
Birch Communications, phone company in the US

See also 
 Birching, a form of corporal punishment with a birch rod
Birch Brothers, a former bus and coach operator in England
 Birchwood (disambiguation)
 Burch (disambiguation)
 The Birches (disambiguation)
 Birch Creek (disambiguation)
 John Birch Society,  is an advocacy group supporting anti-communism and limited government
 White birch (disambiguation)